Marijan Rističević (born 1 March 1958) is a Serbian politician and leader of the People's Peasant Party. He has been a member of the National Assembly of Serbia since 2014.

Political career
He was a presidential candidate in the 2004 Serbian presidential election, when he won 0.33% of votes. He was one of the candidates in the 2008 Serbian presidential election when he won only 0.45% of votes.  He then threw his support to Tomislav Nikolić in the second round of voting.
Rističević portrays himself as a colorful but uneducated peasant, and has gained notoriety in Serbian public because of that image. At one instance, he parked his tractor in front of  the building of the National Assembly.

He has been the president of People's Peasant Party since 1990. In the 2003 Serbian parliamentary election the party in coalition with Party of Serbian Unity and others won 1.79% of the total vote.

References

1958 births
Living people
People's Peasant Party politicians
Candidates for President of Serbia